Kilmihill Ringfort  is a ringfort (rath) and National Monument located in County Limerick, Ireland. On the Record of Monuments and Places its code is LI037-042.

Location

Kilmihill Ringfort is located 1.5 km (1 mile) SSE of Ballingarry.

References

Archaeological sites in County Limerick
National Monuments in County Limerick